László Pető (born 2 November 1948) is a Hungarian fencer. He competed in the individual and team épée events at the 1980 Summer Olympics.

References

External links
 

1948 births
Living people
Hungarian male épée fencers
Olympic fencers of Hungary
Fencers at the 1980 Summer Olympics
Sportspeople from Debrecen